Hickman or Hickmann may refer to:

People
 Hickman (surname), notable people with the surname Hickman or Hickmann
 Hickman Ewing, American attorney
 Hickman Price (1911–1989), assistant secretary in the United States Department of Commerce
 Mônica Hickmann Alves (born 1987), Brazilian footballer
 Orville Hickman Browning (1808–1881), American attorney and politician in Illinois
 Thomas Hickman Williams (1801–1851), American politician in Mississippi

Places

United States
 Hickman, California
 Hickman, Delaware
 Hickman, Kentucky
 Hickman, Maryland
 Hickman, Nebraska
 Hickman, Tennessee
 Hickman County (disambiguation)

Schools
 David H. Hickman High School, in Columbia, Missouri, United States
 Hickman Elementary School (disambiguation)

Other uses 
 Hickman line, an intravenous catheter
 Hickman v. Taylor, a 1947 United States Supreme Court case
 Mackeigan v Hickman, a 1989 Supreme Court of Canada decision on judicial independence
 , a United States Navy cargo ship
 , a United States Navy tank landing ship

See also
 Hickman House (disambiguation)
 
 
 Hickam (disambiguation)